Arthur McLeod "Mac" Wilson (29 July 1922 – 9 October 1996) was an Australian rules footballer who played with Melbourne in the Victorian Football League (VFL).		

His father Arthur Wilson played league football for University Football Club and went on to become a leading obstetrician and gynecologist.  His maternal grandfather was Bob McLeod, who played Test cricket for Australia.

Notes

External links 

	
Profile at Demonwiki

1922 births
1966 deaths
Australian rules footballers from Victoria (Australia)
Melbourne Football Club players
Australian Army personnel of World War II
Australian Army soldiers